"Bron-Y-Aur Stomp" is a song recorded by English rock band Led Zeppelin for their third album, Led Zeppelin III, released in 1970.

Background
The song is named after Bron-Yr-Aur, a house in Montgomeryshire, Wales, where the members of Led Zeppelin retreated in 1970 to write much of Led Zeppelin III after having completed a concert tour of North America. Bron-Yr-Aur means "golden breast" or "breast of gold" in Welsh, as in a hillside of gold. The cottage had no electricity or running water, but the change of scenery provided inspiration for many of the songs on the album, including "Bron-Y-Aur Stomp".

Composition and recording
Jimmy Page and Robert Plant wrote "Bron-Y-Aur Stomp"  in 1970. The song was heavily influenced by a number called "Waggoner's Lad" by Bert Jansch, a Scottish folk musician and founding member of the band Pentangle. It is a country music-inflected hoedown, with lyrics about walking in the woods with Plant's blue-eyed Merle dog named Strider. Plant reportedly named his dog after Aragorn (often called Strider) from J. R. R. Tolkien's The Lord of the Rings.  However, there are no explicit references to Tolkien works in "Bron-Y-Aur Stomp". In live performance, Robert often shouts "Strider!" at the end of the song.

The group recorded the song at Headley Grange in 1970, using the Rolling Stones Mobile Studio.  They completed it at Island Studios in London, and Ardent Studios in Memphis, Tennessee.  Guitarist Jimmy Page used an acoustic guitar,  drummer John Bonham played spoons and castanets, and bassist John Paul Jones played a double bass.

Jennings Farm Blues
Led Zeppelin also recorded the song as an electric blues rock instrumental, "Jennings Farm Blues", a rough mix of which later surfaced as a studio out-take on a number of Led Zeppelin bootleg recordings. Jennings Farm is the name of the property at Blakeshall on which the Plant family stayed in the early 1970s.  "Jennings Farm Blues" was released on 2 June 2014, as part of the remastering process of all nine albums.

See also
List of cover versions of Led Zeppelin songs
List of Led Zeppelin songs written or inspired by others

References

1970 songs
Atlantic Records singles
Led Zeppelin songs
Song recordings produced by Jimmy Page
Songs written by Jimmy Page
Songs written by Robert Plant
Songs written by John Paul Jones (musician)
Skiffle songs